Verkhnyaya Zolotitsa is a rural locality (a village) in Talazhskoye Rural Settlement of Primorsky District, Arkhangelsk Oblast, Russia. The population was 29 as of 2010.

Geography 
Verkhnyaya Zolotitsa is located 117 km north of Arkhangelsk (the district's administrative centre) by road. Nizhnyaya Zolotitsa is the nearest rural locality.

References 

Rural localities in Primorsky District, Arkhangelsk Oblast
Arkhangelsky Uyezd